J. R. Russell (born December 5, 1981) is a former American football wide receiver. He was drafted by the Tampa Bay Buccaneers in the seventh round of the 2005 NFL Draft. He played College football at the University of Louisville.

College career 
During Russell's four years at the University of Louisville, he played in 50 games where he caught 186 passes for 2,619 receiving yards and 19 touchdowns. His best season was in 2003 where he played in 13 games, catching 75 passes for 1,213 yards and 8 touchdowns.

College Statistics

Professional Career

Tampa Bay Buccaneers 
Russell was selected by the Tampa Buccaneers with the 253rd pick in the 2005 NFL Draft.

Russell made the Buccaneers opening day roster, but never played in a game. He was released on November 19, 2005, and was re-signed to the Bucs' practice squad the next day. 

Russell was released on August 29, 2006 after Training Camp.

Orlando Predators (AFL) 
Russell signed with the Orlando Predators on April 12, 2007.

Personal Life 
Currently resides in Tampa with his 3 children and wife Theresa.

Russell goes by the nickname "Sneed." He was given this nickname by a family friend when he was younger.

References

External links
Buccaneers player page
NFL player page

1981 births
Living people
Gaither High School alumni
Players of American football from Tampa, Florida
American football wide receivers
Louisville Cardinals football players
Tampa Bay Buccaneers players
Orlando Predators players